The 2015–16 Costa Rican FPD was the 95th season of the Costa Rican top-flight football league. It was divided in two championships: the Invierno and Verano seasons. 

The Invierno season will be dedicated to Manuel Antonio "Pilo" Obando.

Teams
The league will be contested by a total of 12 teams, including Municipal Liberia, promoted from the 2014–15 Liga de Ascenso, meanwhile Puma Generaleña were relegated.

Personnel, kits and Stadia
Note: Table lists in alphabetical order.

Managerial changes

Before the season

During the season

Campeonato de Invierno
The tournament began on 2015, with TBD defeating TBD 2–0, with Guatemalan player TBD scoring the first goal of the tournament. It ended on 2015, with TBD winning their st title after they overcome TBD in the final.

First stage

Standings

Results

Second stage

Semifinals
First legs

Second legs

Alajuelense won 3–0 on aggregate.

Saprissa won 3–2 on aggregate.

Finals 
First leg

Second leg

Saprissa won 4–1 on aggregate.

List of foreign players in the league
This is a list of foreign players in Invierno 2015. The following players:
have played at least one apertura game for the respective club.
have not been capped for the Costa Rica national football team on any level, independently from the birthplace

A new rule was introduced a few season ago, that clubs can only have three foreign players per club and can only add a new player if there is an injury or player/s is released.

Alajuelense
  Carlos Discua
  Jorge Claros
  Harold Cummings
  Hernán Rivero

Belén
  Sebastián Fassi

Carmelita
  Lucas Monzon
  Jorge Barbosa
  Weller Pereira
  Carlos Souza

Cartaginés
  William Palacios
  Fabrizio Ronchetti

Herediano
  Omar Hernandez
  Edgar Solis
  Gabriel Enrique Gómez
  Jonathan Hansen

Limón
  Mauricio Rivas
  Manuel Lopera
  Serginho Barboza

 (player released during the season)

Pérez Zeledón
  Tomas Fonseca
  Cleiton Januario Franko Kanu
  Christian Yeladián

Municipal Liberia
 None

Saprissa
  Andres Imperiale
  Adolfo Machado

Santos
  Eder Cruz
  Carlos Lopez

Universidad de Costa Rica
  Maximiliano Joel Silva

Uruguay
  Ismael Gomez
  Walter Silva
  Washington Lencina

Top goalscorers

Campeonato de Verano
The tournament began in  January 2016, with TBD defeating TBD 2–0, with TBD scoring the first goal of the tournament. It will end in June 2016, with TBD winning their st title after they overcome TBD in the final.

Personnel, kits and stadia
Note: Table lists in alphabetical order.

Managerial changes

During the season

First stage

Standings

Results

Second stage

Semifinals
First legs

Second legs

2-2 on aggregate. Herediano progressed as the higher seed.

Alajuelense won 5–1 on aggregate.

Finals 
First leg

Second leg

Herediano won 3–0 on aggregate.

List of foreign players in the league
This is a list of foreign players in Verano 2016. The following players:
have played at least one apertura game for the respective club.
have not been capped for the Costa Rica national football team on any level, independently from the birthplace

A new rule was introduced a few season ago, that clubs can only have three foreign players per club and can only add a new player if there is an injury or player/s is released.

Alajuelense
  Carlos Discua
  Jorge Claros
  Harold Cummings
  Hernán Rivero

Belén
  Sebastián Fassi

Carmelita
  Christian Yeladián
  Weller Pereira

Cartaginés
  Fabrizio Ronchetti

Herediano
  Walter Silva
  Omar Hernandez
  Gabriel Enrique Gómez
  Jonathan Hansen

Limón
  Leonardo Javier Terán
  Brunet Hay

 (player released during the season)

Pérez Zeledón
  Tirso Guío
  Cristian Rivas
  Cleiton Januario Franko Kanu
  Pedrinho

Municipal Liberia
  Justo Llorente
  Jonathan De León

Saprissa
  Adolfo Machado
  Jaime Penedo
  Aubrey David

Santos
  Eder Cruz
  Marco Jovanni Rojas
  Marlon López

Universidad de Costa Rica
  Maximiliano Joel Silva

Uruguay
  Ismael Gomez

Aggregate table 

The following table combined the two seasons together.

References

External links
 https://web.archive.org/web/20140809055429/http://unafut.com/site/
 http://www.nacion.com/deportes/futbol-costa-rica/
 http://www.everardoherrera.com/index.php/futbol-nacional 

Liga FPD seasons
1
Costa